NGC 3 is a lenticular galaxy in the Pisces constellation. It was discovered on November 29, 1864 by Albert Marth.

References

External links
 
 

Galaxies discovered in 1864
Lenticular galaxies
Pisces (constellation)
0003
00565
00058
18641129